Twist-related protein 1 (TWIST1) also known as class A basic helix–loop–helix protein 38 (bHLHa38) is a basic helix-loop-helix transcription factor that in humans is encoded by the TWIST1 gene.

Function 

Basic helix-loop-helix (bHLH) transcription factors have been implicated in cell lineage determination and differentiation. The protein encoded by this gene is a bHLH transcription factor and shares similarity with another bHLH transcription factor, Dermo1 (a.k.a. TWIST2). The strongest expression of this mRNA is in placental tissue; in adults, mesodermally derived tissues express this mRNA preferentially.

Twist1 is thought to regulate osteogenic lineage.

Clinical significance 

Mutations in the TWIST1 gene are associated with Saethre–Chotzen syndrome, breast cancer, and Sézary syndrome.

As an oncogene 
Twist plays an essential role in cancer metastasis. Over-expression of Twist or methylation of its promoter is common in metastatic carcinomas.  Hence targeting Twist has a great promise as a cancer therapeutic. In cooperation with N-Myc, Twist-1 acts as an oncogene in several cancers including neuroblastoma.

Twist is activated by a variety of signal transduction pathways, including Akt, signal transducer and activator of transcription 3 (STAT3), mitogen-activated protein kinase, Ras, and Wnt signaling. Activated Twist upregulates N-cadherin and downregulates E-cadherin, which are the hallmarks of EMT. Moreover, Twist plays an important role in some physiological processes involved in metastasis, like angiogenesis, invadopodia, extravasation, and chromosomal instability. Twist also protects cancer cells from apoptotic cell death. In addition, Twist is responsible for the maintenance of cancer stem cells and the development of chemotherapy resistance. Twist1 is extensively studied for its role in head- and neck cancers. Here and in epithelial ovarian cancer, Twist1 has been shown to be involved in evading apoptosis, making the tumour cells resistant against platinum-based chemotherapeutic drugs like cisplatin. Moreover, Twist1 has been shown to be expressed under conditions of hypoxia, corresponding to the observation that hypoxic cells respond less to chemotherapeutic drugs.

Another process in which Twist 1 is involved is tumour metastasis. The underlying mechanism is not completely understood, but it has been implicated in the upregulation of matrix metalloproteinases and inhibition of TIMP.

Recently, targeting Twist has gained interest as a target for cancer therapeutics. The inactivation of Twist by small interfering RNA or chemotherapeutic approach has been demonstrated in vitro. Moreover, several inhibitors which are antagonistic to the upstream or downstream molecules of Twist signaling pathways have also been identified.

Interactions 

Twist transcription factor has been shown to interact with EP300, TCF3 and PCAF.

See also 

Transcription factor
TWIST2

References

Further reading 

 
 
 
 
 
 
 
 
 
 
 
 
 
 
 
 
 
 
 
 Z

External links 
  GeneReviews/NCBI.NIH.UW entry on Saethre–Chotzen syndrome
 

Transcription factors